The 1956 Cupa României Final was the 19th final of Romania's most prestigious football cup competition. It was disputed between Energia Câmpia Turzii and Progresul Oradea, and was won by Progresul Oradea after a game with 2 goals. It was the first cup for Progresul Oradea.

Energia Câmpia Turzii was the fifth club representing Divizia B which reached the Romanian Cup final.

Match details

See also 
List of Cupa României finals

References

External links
Romaniansoccer.ro

1956
Cupa
Romania
Cupa României Fina